John Michael Mead (April 18, 1921 – February 22, 2001 was an American football player in the National Football League (NFL). He was drafted in the seventh round of the 1945 NFL Draft by the New York Giants and would later play two seasons with the team.

References

1921 births
2001 deaths
American football ends
New York Giants players
Wisconsin Badgers football players
Sportspeople from Appleton, Wisconsin
Players of American football from Milwaukee